Highland Mills is a hamlet and former census-designated place (CDP) in Orange County, New York, United States. The population was 3,468 at the 2000 census. It is part of the Poughkeepsie–Newburgh–Middletown, NY Metropolitan Statistical Area as well as the larger New York–Newark–Bridgeport, NY-NJ-CT-PA Combined Statistical Area.

Highland Mills is in the town and village of Woodbury adjacent to the New York State Thruway (Interstate 87). The U.S. Census Bureau ceased counting Highland Mills as a separate designated place when the town of Woodbury incorporated as a village.

Geography
Highland Mills is located at  (41.351299, -74.127810).

Highland Mills is located in the southeastern corner of New York State, approximately one hour north-northwest of New York City.

Demographics
As of the census of 2000, there were 3,468 people, 1,196 households, and 955 families residing in the CDP. The population density was 2,007.5 per square mile (774.0/km2). There were 1,279 housing units at an average density of 740.4/sq mi (285.4/km2). The racial makeup of the CDP was 87.17% white, 5.07% African American, .14% Native American, 2.71% Asian, .06% Pacific Islander, 2.36% from other races, and 2.48% from two or more races. Hispanic or Latino of any race were 9.05% of the population.

There were 1,196 households, out of which 47.5% had children under the age of 18 living with them, 66.3% were married couples living together, 10.5% had a female householder with no husband present, and 20.1% were non-families. 16.6% of all households were made up of individuals, and 4.3% had someone living alone who was 65 years of age or older. The average household size was 2.90 and the average family size was 3.3.

In the CDP, the population was spread out, with 31.3% under the age of 18, 4.8% from 18 to 24, 32.6% from 25 to 44, 24.7% from 45 to 64, and 6.6% who were 65 years of age or older. The median age was 36 years. For every 100 females, there were 91.8 males. For every 100 females age 18 and over, there were 88 males.

The median income for a household in the CDP was $80,581, and the median income for a family was $84,249. Males had a median income of $62,281 versus $37,857 for females. The per capita income for the CDP was $30,257. About 1.7% of families and 3% of the population were below the poverty line, including 2.8% of those under age 18 and 1.8% of those age 65 or over.

References

External links
 The Photo News (local area newspaper)
 Highland Mills magician Matt Stevens
 http://www.theroyalpiper.com Highland Mills musician Al Gonzales/The RoyalPiper

Hamlets in Orange County, New York
Hamlets in New York (state)
Poughkeepsie–Newburgh–Middletown metropolitan area
Former census-designated places in New York (state)